The 2013 Nordic Figure Skating Championships was held from January 31 to February 3, 2013 at the Egilshöll in Reykjavík, Iceland. Skaters competed in the disciplines of men's singles and ladies' singles on the senior, junior, and novice levels.

Senior results

Men

Ladies

Junior results

Men

Ladies

References

External links
 Result details
 Official site

Nordic Figure Skating Championships
Nordic Figure Skating Championships
Nordic Championships, 2013
2013 in Icelandic sport